Alpaida (also Alpaïde, Alpaide, Alphaida, Alpoïde, Elphide, Elfide, Chalpaida;  654 – c. 714) was a Frankish noblewoman who hailed from the Liège area. She became the wife of Pippin of Herstal (635 or 640 – 16 December 714) and mother to two sons by him, Charles Martel (Charles the Hammer) (688 – 22 October 741) and Childebrand I (678–751).

In the Liber Historiae Francorum and the Continuations of Fredegar she is referred to as Pepin's wife.

Saint Lambert of Maastricht was a vocal critic of the relationship between Pepin and Alpaida. A tradition would eventually develop that, Pepin's domesticus (manager of state domains) Dodon, whose troops would murder Lambert, was in fact the brother of Alpaida; however, the historical accuracy of Dodon being her brother has been questioned.

References

7th-century Frankish women
Mistresses of Frankish royalty
7th-century Frankish nobility
654 births
714 deaths
8th-century Frankish women
8th-century Frankish nobility